Slovenská pošta, a. s. (literally Slovak Post) is a state-owned company responsible for providing postal service in Slovakia established on 1 January 1993 when Slovakia became an independent state and became a public limited company owned by the state on 1 October 2004. It operates over 1,500 post offices throughout the country. It is also the third largest employer in Slovakia. The headquarters are located in Banská Bystrica.

Among the organisation's responsibilities are providing a universal postal service, express and courier delivery, operating temporary post offices, issuing postage stamps and a postal museum.

References

External links

Companies of Slovakia
Companies based in Bratislava
Companies established in 1993
Postal organizations
Postal system of Slovakia
Slovak brands